Assistant Commandant is a title often given to the second-in-command of a military, uniformed service, training establishment or academy. This usage is common in English-speaking nations, and in some countries it may be a military or police rank.

India 
The rank of assistant commandant is equivalent to the ranks of assistant commissioner of police (ACP), deputy superintendent of police (DSP), and Captain in the Indian Army. This rank is a group-A gazetted officer in the Central Armed Police Forces of India.

Assistant commandants in Central Armed Police Forces (CAPF) are appointed through a Union Public Service Commission (UPSC) selection process and are called directly appointed gazetted officers.

Assistant commandants are mandated to command companies and direct action teams (DATs) in various CAPFs and law enforcement agencies, They are also sent on deputations to serve in various important organizations such as RAW, NSG, SPG, NIA, IB, CBI, NDRF, NCB, state armed police force (DRG, Jharkhand Jaguars, Bihar military police, IRB, UP/MP STF, etc.), and Indian Army on deputation. Their role and performance therefore assumes an enormous significance because of the special features of an emergency force which is pressed in aid to civil power to perform multiple roles in extremely difficult situations. They are also known for leading operations while on attachment with the state police forces of India.

Promotional avenues for gazetted officers 
After joining service as assistant commandant the following promotional avenues are available to cadre officers:-

Pay scale of assistant commandants in CAPFs

Subordinate officers (SOs) 
Sub Inspectors are recruited through competitive examination conducted by Staff Selection Commission and they are referred to as DASOs (directly appointed subordinate officers). DESOs (departmental entry subordinate officers) are those officers who have been promoted through departmental exams conducted internally for inspectors, sub inspectors, assistant sub inspectors, head constables, constables etc.

United States

In the United States, assistant commandant is an appointment, not a rank. A common use of the term is for the position of assistant commandant of the Marine Corps.

References

Police ranks of India
Central Armed Police Forces of India
Indian Coast Guard